The 2014–15 Segunda División Femenina de Fútbol was the 2014–15 edition of Spain's women's football second league.

Competition format
The champion of each group and the best runner-up qualified to the promotion play-offs. For the group 6, composed by teams from the Canary Islands, the two best teams of each sub-group joined a previous playoff where the champion would be the eighth team qualified.

Only two teams promoted to Primera División.

Group 1

Group 2

Group 3

Group 4

Group 5

Group 6

Group 6.1

Group 6.2

Bracket

Group 7

Best runner-up
The best runner-up of the entire group phase qualified automatically for the promotion play-off

Promotion playoffs

Bracket

Spa
2
Women2
Segunda División (women) seasons